Josef Doležal (12 December 1920 in Příbram – 28 January 1999 in Prague) was a Czechoslovak athlete who competed mainly in the 50 kilometre walk.

He competed for Czechoslovakia in the 1952 Summer Olympics held in Helsinki, Finland in the 50 kilometre walk where he won the silver medal.

References

1920 births
1999 deaths
Sportspeople from Příbram
Czech male racewalkers
Czechoslovak male racewalkers
Olympic athletes of Czechoslovakia
Olympic silver medalists for Czechoslovakia
Athletes (track and field) at the 1952 Summer Olympics
Athletes (track and field) at the 1956 Summer Olympics
Athletes (track and field) at the 1960 Summer Olympics
World record setters in athletics (track and field)
European Athletics Championships medalists
Medalists at the 1952 Summer Olympics
Olympic silver medalists in athletics (track and field)